Ratatouille is a 2007 American computer-animated comedy-drama film produced by Pixar Animation Studios and released by Walt Disney Pictures. The eighth film produced by Pixar, it was written and directed by Brad Bird, who took over from Jan Pinkava in 2005, and produced by Brad Lewis, from an original idea by Pinkava, who was credited for conceiving the film's story with Bird and Jim Capobianco. The film stars the voices of Patton Oswalt, Lou Romano, Ian Holm, Janeane Garofalo, Peter O'Toole, Brian Dennehy, Peter Sohn, and Brad Garrett. The title refers to the French dish ratatouille, which is served at the end of the film, and also references the species of the main character, a rat. Set in Paris, the plot follows a young rat Remy (Oswalt) who dreams of becoming a chef at Auguste Gusteau's (Garrett) restaurant and tries to achieve his goal by forming an unlikely alliance with the restaurant's garbage boy Alfredo Linguini (Romano).

Development for Ratatouille began in 2000 when Pinkava wrote the original concepts of the film, although he was never formally named the director of the film. In 2005, following Pinkava's departure from Pixar for lacking confidence in the story development, Bird was approached to direct the film and revise the story. Bird and some of the film's crew members also visited Paris for inspiration. To create the food animation used in the film, the crew consulted chefs from both France and the United States. Lewis interned at Thomas Keller's The French Laundry restaurant, where Keller developed the confit byaldi, a dish used in the film. Michael Giacchino composed the Paris-inspired music for the film.

Ratatouille premiered on June 22, 2007, at the Kodak Theatre in Los Angeles, California, with its general release on June 29, in the United States. The film became a critical and commercial success, grossed $623.7 million, finishing its theatrical run as the sixth highest-grossing film of 2007 and the year's second highest-grossing animated film (behind Shrek the Third and received widespread critical acclaim for its screenplay, animation, humor, voice acting, and Michael Giacchino's score. It also won the Academy Award for Best Animated Feature and was nominated for several more, including Best Original Screenplay. Ratatouille was later voted one of the 100 greatest motion pictures of the 21st century by a 2016 poll of international critics conducted by the BBC. This film was dedicated to animator Dan Lee, who died from complications relating to his lung cancer positive diagnosis on January 16, 2005, two years before the film's release.

Plot

Remy, a young rat with heightened senses of taste and smell, dreams of becoming a chef like his human idol, the late Auguste Gusteau, but the rest of his colony, including his older brother Émile and his father, the clan leader Django, only eat for sustenance and are wary of humans. The rats live in an elderly woman's attic outside Paris, but when the woman discovers the rats, they're forced to evacuate, and Remy is separated from the others. Encouraged by an imaginary Gusteau, he explores until he finds himself on the roof of Gusteau's restaurant.

Remy notices the restaurant's new garbage boy, Alfredo Linguini, attempting to fix a soup he ruined, and jumps in to fix Linguini's mistakes. Linguini catches Remy in the act, but does not reveal him to Skinner, Gusteau's former sous-chef and the new owner of the restaurant. Skinner confronts Linguini for tampering with the soup, but when the soup is accidentally served and proves to be a success, Colette Tatou, the restaurant's only female chef, convinces Skinner to retain Linguini and uphold Gusteau's motto, "Anyone can cook". After demanding that Linguini replicate the soup, Skinner spots Remy and orders Linguini to take him outside and kill him. Once they're alone, Linguini discovers that Remy can understand him, and he convinces Remy to help him cook.

Remy controls Linguini's movements like a marionette by pulling on his hair while hiding under his toque. They recreate the soup, and continue cooking at the restaurant. Colette begrudgingly trains Linguini, but steadily comes to appreciate someone heeding her advice. Later, Remy finds Émile and reunites with the clan. After Remy tells Django that he intends to stay at the restaurant, Django shows him a group of exterminated rats in an attempt to convince him that humans are dangerous, but Remy ignores his warnings and leaves.

Meanwhile, Skinner discovers through a letter from Linguini's late mother that Linguini is Gusteau's illegitimate son, and the rightful owner of the restaurant. Skinner is shocked and enraged about this revelation, as Gusteau's will stated that he would inherit ownership of the restaurant, only if no biological heir appeared two years prior to the latter's death. After his lawyer verifies that Linguini is Gusteau's heir, Skinner hides the evidence in an envelope, but Remy finds it and runs away, showing the documents to Linguini, who then forces Skinner out. The restaurant thrives as Remy's recipes become popular, and Linguini's life improves as he develops a romantic relationship with Colette. Food critic Anton Ego, whose previous negative review of the restaurant indirectly led to Gusteau's death, announces to Linguini that he will dine at the restaurant. After Linguini takes credit for Remy's cooking at a press conference, he and Remy have a falling out. As revenge, Remy leads his clan to raid the restaurant's pantries for food. Linguini arrives to apologize, but upon discovering the raid, he furiously kicks Remy and the other rats out.

The next day, Remy is captured by Skinner but promptly freed by Django and Émile. After returning to the restaurant, he and Linguini reconcile, and Linguini reveals the truth to his staff, who all immediately quit. Reminded of Gusteau's motto, Colette returns to help Django and the clan cook to Remy's directions, while Linguini waits tables. Skinner and a health inspector attempt to interfere, but are locked in the pantry by the rats. Remy creates a variation of ratatouille which reminds Ego of his mother's cooking. Ego asks to meet the chef, and is stunned upon being introduced to Remy after the restaurant closes for the evening. The next day, he writes a review titled "France's Finest", stating that he has come to understand Gusteau's motto, and describes Remy - without revealing that he is a rat - as "nothing less than the finest chef in France".

After Skinner and the health inspector are released, they inform the authorities and the restaurant is shut down, stripping Ego of his job and credibility. Remy, Linguini, and Colette open a bistro, called La Ratatouille, which a now-happier Ego invests in and frequently visits, and the rat colony settles into the bistro's attic as their new home.

Voice cast

 Patton Oswalt as Remy, a young brown rat who is interested in cooking. Director Brad Bird chose Oswalt after hearing his food-related comedy routine.
 Lou Romano as Alfredo Linguini, the illegitimate son of the deceased famous chef Auguste Gusteau and the restaurant’s hapless garbage boy who befriends Remy
 Ian Holm as Jonah Robert Skinner, the cruel, rat-hating new owner of Gusteau’s, as well as its head chef and former sous chef before Gusteau’s death. Skinner's behavior, diminutive size, and body language are loosely based on Louis de Funès. The character was named after the psychologist B. F. Skinner.
 Brian Dennehy as Django, Remy's father and leader.
 Peter Sohn as Émile, Remy's older brother
 Peter O'Toole as Anton Ego, a cynical and easily displeased restaurant critic, inspired by Louis Jouvet.
 Brad Garrett as Auguste Gusteau, the recently deceased founder of his respective restaurant of the same name, inspired by real-life chef Bernard Loiseau, who died of a broken heart after his restaurant, La Côte d'Or, lost a star. La Côte d'Or was one of the restaurants visited by Brad Bird and others in France.
 Janeane Garofalo as Colette Tatou, Gusteau’s rôtisseur, the restaurant’s only female cook, and Linguini’s love interest, inspired by French chef Hélène Darroze.
 Will Arnett as Horst, Skinner's German sous chef
 Julius Callahan as Lalo, Gusteau's saucier and poissonnier
 Callahan also voices François, the advertising executive handling the marketing of Skinner's microwaveable food under Gusteau's name
 James Remar as Larousse, Gusteau's garde manger
 John Ratzenberger as Mustafa, Gusteau's chef de salle
 Teddy Newton as Talon Labarthe, Skinner's lawyer
 Tony Fucile as  Patrick Pompidou, Gusteau's pâtissier
 Fucile also voices Nadar Lessard, a health inspector employed by Skinner. In the UK version, Lessard is voiced by Jamie Oliver.
 Jake Steinfeld as Git, a former lab rat and member of Django's colony
 Brad Bird as Ambrister Minion, Ego's butler
 Stéphane Roux as TV narrator

Production

Jan Pinkava came up with the concept in 2000, creating the original design, sets and characters and core storyline, but he was never formally named the director of the film. By 2004, Pixar added Bob Peterson as a co-director and he was given exclusive control of the story. After three months and lacking confidence in the story development, Pixar management turned to The Incredibles director Brad Bird to direct the film, just as Pinkava departed Pixar in 2005 while Peterson left the film to return to work on Up. Bird was attracted to the film because of the outlandishness of the concept and the conflict that drove it: that rats feared kitchens, yet a rat wanted to work in one. Bird was also delighted that the film could be made a highly physical comedy, with the character of Linguini providing endless fun for the animators. Bird rewrote the story, with a change in emphasis. He killed off Gusteau, gave larger roles to Skinner and Colette, and also changed the appearance of the rats to be less anthropomorphic.

Because Ratatouille is intended to be a romantic, lush vision of Paris, giving it an identity distinct from the studio's previous films, director Brad Bird, producer Brad Lewis and some of the crew spent a week in the city to properly understand its environment, taking a motorcycle tour and eating at five top restaurants. There are also many water-based sequences in the film, one of which is set in the sewers and is more complex than the blue whale scene in Finding Nemo. One scene has Linguini wet after jumping into the Seine to fetch Remy. A Pixar employee (Shade/Paint department coordinator Kesten Migdal) jumped into Pixar's swimming pool wearing a chef's uniform and apron to see which parts of the suit stuck to his body and which became translucent from water absorption.

A challenge for the filmmakers was creating computer-generated images of food that would appear delicious. Gourmet chefs in both the U.S. and France were consulted, and animators attended cooking classes at San Francisco-area culinary schools to understand the workings of a commercial kitchen. Sets/Layout department manager Michael Warch, a culinary-academy-trained professional chef before working at Pixar, helped teach and consult animators as they worked. He also prepared dishes used by the Art, Shade/Paint, Effects and Sets Modeling departments. Renowned chef Thomas Keller allowed producer Brad Lewis to intern in his French Laundry kitchen. For the film's climax, Keller designed a fancy, layered version of the title dish for the rat characters to cook, which he called "confit byaldi" in honor of the original Turkish name. The same sub-surface light scattering technique that was used on the skin in The Incredibles was used on fruits and vegetables, while new programs gave an organic texture and movement to the food. Completing the illusion were music, dialogue, and abstract imagery representing the characters' mental sensations while appreciating food. The visual flavor metaphors were created by animator Michel Gagné inspired by the work of Oscar Fischinger and Norman McLaren.
To create a realistic compost pile, the Art Department photographed fifteen different kinds of produce, such as apples, berries, bananas, mushrooms, oranges, broccoli, and lettuce, in the process of rotting.

The cast members strove to make their French accents authentic yet understandable. John Ratzenberger notes that he often segued into an Italian accent. Ian Holm was cast as the character of Skinner since Bird saw him on The Lord of the Rings trilogy. According to Pixar designer Jason Deamer, "Most of the characters were designed while Jan [Pinkava] was still directing… He has a real eye for sculpture." According to Pinkava, the critic Anton Ego was designed to resemble a vulture. To save time, human characters were designed and animated without toes. Dana Carvey was originally approached for a role but he declined as he was busy raising kids.

Rat expert Debbie Ducommun (a.k.a. the "Rat Lady") was consulted on rat habits and characteristics. Along with Ducommun's insight a vivarium containing pet rats sat in a hallway for more than a year so animators could study the movement of the animals' fur, noses, ears, paws, and tails as they ran.

Promotional material for Intel credits their platform for a 30 percent performance improvement in rendering software. They used Ratatouille in some of their marketing materials.

The film was animated with traditional techniques rather than motion capture. Bird noted this in the credits because he felt there was a trend of using real-time performance capture in animated films instead of the frame by frame methodology he "love[s] & was proud that we had used" on the movie.

Soundtrack

Ratatouille is the second Pixar film to be scored by Michael Giacchino after The Incredibles. It is also the second Pixar film not to be scored by Randy or Thomas Newman. The scores feature a wide range of instrumentation and are influenced by various music genres. Giacchino wrote two themes for Remy, one about him with the rat colony and the other about his hopes and dreams. He also wrote a buddy theme for both Remy and Linguini that plays when they are together. In addition to the score, Giacchino wrote the main theme song, "Le Festin", about Remy and his dream to be a chef. French artist Camille (who was 29 at the time of the film's release) was hired to perform "Le Festin" after Giacchino listened to her music and realized she was perfect for the song; as a result, the song is sung in French in almost all versions of the film. The soundtrack album was released by Walt Disney Records on June 26, 2007.

Release

Theatrical
Ratatouille was originally going to be released on June 9, 2006; however, on December 8, 2004, the date was changed to June 29, 2007. This happened because Disney/Pixar changed the release date of Cars from November 4, 2005 to June 9, 2006, thus pushing Ratatouille to June 29, 2007.

Ratatouilles world premiere was on June 22, 2007, at Los Angeles' Kodak Theatre. The commercial release was one week later, with the short film Lifted preceding Ratatouille in theaters. Earlier in the year, it had received an Academy Award nomination. A test screening of the film was shown at the Harkins Cine Capri Theater in Scottsdale, Arizona on June 16, 2007, at which a Pixar representative was present to collect viewer feedback. Disney CEO Bob Iger announced an upcoming theatrical re-release of the film in 3D at the Disney shareholders meeting in March 2014.

Marketing
The trailer for Ratatouille debuted with the release of Cars, its immediate predecessor. It depicts an original scene where Remy is caught red-handed on the cheese trolley in the restaurant's dining area, sampling the cheese and barely escaping the establishment, intercut with separate scenes of the rat explaining directly to the audience why he is taking such risks. Similar to most of Pixar's teaser trailers, the scene was not present in the final film release.

A second trailer was released on March 23, 2007. The Ratatouille Big Cheese Tour began on May 11, 2007, with cooking demonstrations and a film preview. Voice actor Lou Romano attended the San Francisco leg of the tour for autograph signings.

Disney and Pixar were working to bring a French-produced Ratatouille-branded wine to Costco stores in August 2007, but abandoned plans because of complaints from the California Wine Institute, citing standards in labelling that restrict the use of cartoon characters to avoid attracting under-age drinkers. Moreover, both companies faced other challenges trying to lure audiences, as several stores had been overflowing with merchandise themed to other newly released films like Spider-Man 3, Shrek the Third and Transformers, making it tougher to persuade parents to spend an additional cost between $7.99 to $19.99 on a plush rat.

In the United Kingdom, in place of releasing a theatrical trailer, a commercial featuring Remy and Emile was released in cinemas before its release to discourage obtaining unlicensed copies of films. Also, in the United Kingdom, the main characters were used for a commercial for the Nissan Note, with Remy and Emile watching an original commercial for it made for the "Surprisingly Spacious" ad campaign and also parodying it, respectively.

Disney/Pixar was concerned that audiences, particularly children, would not be familiar with the word "ratatouille" and its pronunciation. The title was, therefore, also spelled phonetically within trailers and on posters. For similar reasons, in the American release of the film, on-screen text in French was printed in English, such as the title of Gusteau's cookbook and the sign telling kitchen staff to wash their hands, though, in the British English release, these are rendered in French. In Canada, the film was released theatrically with text in English, but on DVD, the majority of the text (including Gusteau's will) was in French.

Home media
Ratatouille was released by Walt Disney Studios Home Entertainment on Blu-ray and DVD in North America on November 6, 2007. A new animated short film featuring Remy and Emile entitled Your Friend the Rat was included as a special feature, in which the two rats attempt to entreat the viewer, a human, to welcome rats as their friends, demonstrating the benefits and misconceptions of rats towards humanity through several historical examples. The eleven-minute short uses 3-D animation, 2-D animation, live action and even stop-motion animation, a first for Pixar.

The disc also includes a CGI short entitled Lifted, which was screened before the film during its theatrical run. It depicts an adolescent extraterrestrial attempting to kidnap a sleeping human. Throughout the sequence, he is graded by an adult extraterrestrial in a manner reminiscent of a driver's licensing exam road test. The entire short contains no dialogue, which is typical of Pixar Shorts not based on existing properties. Also included among the special features are deleted scenes, a featurette featuring Brad Bird discussing filmmaking and chef Thomas Keller discussing culinary creativity entitled "Fine Food and Film", and four easter eggs. Although the Region A Blu-ray edition has a French audio track, the Region 1 DVD does not, except for some copies sold in Canada.

The DVD release on November 6, 2007, earned 4,919,574 units (equivalent to ) in its first week (November 6–11, 2007) during which it topped the DVD charts. In total it sold 12,531,266 units becoming the second-best-selling animated DVD of 2007, both in units sold and sales revenue, behind Happy Feet. In 2014 the film was re-rendered in 3D and in July of that year was released on Blu-ray 3D in the UK, France, and India.  In 2019, Ratatouille was released on 4K Ultra HD Blu-ray.

Plagiarized film

If magazine described Ratatoing, a 2007 Brazilian computer graphics cartoon by Vídeo Brinquedo, as a "ripoff" of Ratatouille. Marco Aurélio Canônico of the Brazilian newspaper Folha de S.Paulo described Ratatoing as a derivative of Ratatouille. Canônico discussed whether Ratatoing was similar enough to Ratatouille to warrant a lawsuit for copyright violation. The Brazilian Ministry of Culture posted Marco Aurélio Canônico's article on its website. To date no sources have been found to indicate that Pixar took legal action.

Reception

Critical response
The review aggregator website Rotten Tomatoes reported  approval rating with an average rating of  based on  reviews. The site's consensus reads: "Fast-paced and stunningly animated, Ratatouille adds another delightfully entertaining entry—and a rather unlikely hero—to the Pixar canon." On Metacritic, it has a weighted average score of 96 out of 100 based on 37 reviews, the highest of any Pixar film and the 46th highest-rated film on the site. Audiences surveyed by CinemaScore gave the film a grade "A" on scale of A+ to F.

A. O. Scott of The New York Times called Ratatouille "a nearly flawless piece of popular art, as well as one of the most persuasive portraits of an artist ever committed to film"; echoing the character Anton Ego in the film, he ended his review with a simple "thank you" to the creators of the film. Wally Hammond of Time Out gave the film five out of five stars, saying "A test for tiny tots, a mite nostalgic and as male-dominated as a modern kitchen it may be, but these are mere quibbles about this delightful addition to the Pixar pantheon." Andrea Gronvall of the Chicago Reader gave the film a positive review, saying "Brad Bird's second collaboration with Pixar is more ambitious and meditative than his Oscar-winning The Incredibles." Owen Gleiberman of Entertainment Weekly gave the film a B, saying "Ratatouille has the Pixar technical magic without, somehow, the full Pixar flavor. It's Brad Bird's genial dessert, not so much incredible as merely sweetly edible." Peter Travers of Rolling Stone gave the film three-and-a-half stars out of four, saying "What makes Ratatouille such a hilarious and heartfelt wonder is the way Bird contrives to let it sneak up on you. And get a load of that score from Michael Giacchino, a perfect complement to a delicious meal." James Berardinelli of ReelViews gave the film three out of four stars, saying "For parents looking to spend time in a theater with their kids or adults who want something lighter and less testosterone-oriented than the usual summer fare, Ratatouille offers a savory main course." Christy Lemire of the Associated Press gave the film a positive review, saying "Ratatouille is free of the kind of gratuitous pop-culture references that plague so many movies of the genre; it tells a story, it's very much of our world but it never goes for the cheap, easy gag." Justin Chang of Variety gave the film a positive review, saying "The master chefs at Pixar have blended all the right ingredients—abundant verbal and visual wit, genius slapstick timing, a soupcon of Gallic sophistication—to produce a warm and irresistible concoction."

Michael Phillips of the Chicago Tribune gave the film four out of four stars, saying "The film may be animated, and largely taken up with rats, but its pulse is gratifyingly human. And you have never seen a computer-animated feature with this sort of visual panache and detail." Rafer Guzman of Newsday gave the film three out of four stars, saying "So many computer-animated movies are brash, loud and popping with pop-culture comedy, but Ratatouille has the warm glow of a favorite book. The characters are more than the sum of their gigabyte-consuming parts – they feel handcrafted." Roger Moore of the Orlando Sentinel gave the film three out of five stars, saying "Has Pixar lost its magic recipe? Ratatouille is filled with fairly generic animated imagery, a few modest chases, a couple of good gags, not a lot of laughs." Scott Foundas of LA Weekly gave the film a positive review, saying "Bird has taken the raw ingredients of an anthropomorphic-animal kiddie matinee and whipped them into a heady brew about nothing less than the principles of artistic creation." Colin Covert of the Star Tribune gave the film four out of four stars, saying "It's not just the computer animation that is vibrantly three-dimensional. It's also the well-rounded characters… I defy you to name another animated film so overflowing with superfluous beauty." Steven Rea of The Philadelphia Inquirer gave the film three-and-a-half stars out of four, saying "With Ratatouille, Bird once again delivers not just a great, witty story, but dazzling visuals as well." Bill Muller of The Arizona Republic gave the film four-and-a-half stars out of five, saying "Like the burbling soup that plays a key part in Ratatouille, the movie is a delectable blend of ingredients that tickles the palette and leaves you hungry for more."

Rene Rodriguez of the Miami Herald gave the film three out of four stars, saying "Ratatouille is the most straightforward and formulaic picture to date from Pixar Animation Studios, but it is also among the most enchanting and touching." Jack Mathews of the New York Daily News gave the film four out of four stars, saying "The Pixar magic continues with Brad Bird's Ratatouille, a gorgeous, wonderfully inventive computer-animated comedy." Stephen Whitty of the Newark Star-Ledger gave the film three out of four stars, saying "Fresh family fun. Although there are those slightly noxious images of rodents scampering around a kitchen, the movie doesn't stoop to kid-pandering jokes based on backtalk and bodily gases." David Ansen of Newsweek gave the film a positive review, saying "A film as rich as a sauce béarnaise, as refreshing as a raspberry sorbet, and a lot less predictable than the damn food metaphors and adjectives all us critics will churn out to describe it. OK, one more and then I'll be done: it's yummy." Peter Hartlaub of the San Francisco Chronicle gave the film four out of four stars, saying "Ratatouille never overwhelms, even though it's stocked with action, romance, historical content, family drama and serious statements about the creation of art." Richard Corliss of Time gave the film a positive review, saying "From the moment Remy enters, crashing, to the final happy fadeout, Ratatouille parades the brio and depth that set Pixar apart from and above other animation studios." Roger Ebert of the Chicago Sun-Times gave the film four out of four stars, saying "A lot of animated movies have inspired sequels, notably Shrek, but Brad Bird's Ratatouille is the first one that made me positively desire one." Peter Howell of the Toronto Star gave the film four out of four stars, saying "Had Bird gone the safe route, he would have robbed us of a great new cartoon figure in Remy, who like the rest of the film is rendered with animation that is at once fanciful and life-like. It's also my pick for Pixar's best."

Joe Morgenstern of The Wall Street Journal gave the film a positive review, saying "The characters are irresistible, the animation is astonishing and the film, a fantasy version of a foodie rhapsody, sustains a level of joyous invention that hasn't been seen in family entertainment since The Incredibles." Kenneth Turan of the Los Angeles Times gave the film four-and-a-half stars out of five, saying "Brad Bird's Ratatouille is so audacious you have to fall in love with its unlikely hero." Claudia Puig of USA Today gave the film three-and-a-half stars out of four, saying "Ratatouille is delicious fun sure to be savored by audiences of all ages for its sumptuous visuals, clever wit and irresistibly inspiring tale." Miriam Di Nunzio of the Chicago Sun-Times gave the film three-and-a-half stars out of four, saying "Ratatouille will make you wonder why animation needs to hide behind the mantle of 'it's for children, but grownups will like it, too.' This one's for Mom and Dad, and yep, the kids will like it, too." Michael Booth of The Denver Post gave the film three-and-a-half stars out of four, saying "Writer and director Brad Bird keeps Ratatouille moving without resorting to the cute animal jokes or pop-culture wisecracking that ruined so many other recent animated films." Tom Long of The Detroit News gave the film an A, saying "Ratatouille has the technical genius, emotional core and storytelling audacity to lift it into the ranks of [the best] Pixar films, the crème de la crème of modern animation." Liam Lacey of The Globe and Mail gave the film three-and-a-half stars out of four, saying "No sketchy backgrounds here—Ratatouilles scenes feel like deep-focus camera shots. The textures, from the gleam of copper pans to the cobblestone streets, are almost palpable." Desson Thomson of The Washington Post gave the film a positive review, saying "Ratatouille doesn't center on the over-familiar surfaces of contemporary life. It harks back to Disney's older era when cartoons seemed part of a more elegant world with less edgy characters."

Box office
In its opening weekend in North America, Ratatouille opened in 3,940 theaters and debuted at number one with $47.2 million, the lowest Pixar opening since A Bug's Life. When the film opened, it topped at the box office ahead of 20th Century Fox's Live Free or Die Hard. Ratatouille was the first non-sequel film to reach the number one spot since Disturbia debuted two months earlier. The film only stayed in its position for a few days before being taken by Transformers. In France, where the film is set, the film broke the record for the biggest debut for an animated film and dethroned Titanic for the most consecutive weeks at the top of the box office. In the United Kingdom, the film debuted at number one with sales over £4 million. The film has grossed $206.4 million in the United States and Canada and a total of $623.7 million worldwide, making it the seventh-highest-grossing Pixar film.

Accolades

Ratatouille won the Academy Award for Best Animated Feature at the 80th Academy Awards and was nominated for four others: Best Original Score, Best Sound Editing, Best Sound Mixing, Best Original Screenplay, losing to Atonement, The Bourne Ultimatum (for both Best Sound Editing and Best Sound Mixing), and Juno, respectively. With five Oscar nominations, the film broke the record for an animated feature film, surpassing the four nominations each of Aladdin, Monsters, Inc., Finding Nemo, and The Incredibles. As of 2013, Ratatouille is tied with Up and Toy Story 3 for the second-most Oscar nominations for an animated film, behind Beauty and the Beast and WALL-E (six).

Furthermore, Ratatouille was nominated for 13 Annie Awards including twice in the Best Animated Effects, where it lost to Surf's Up, and three times in the Best Voice Acting in an Animated Feature Production for Janeane Garofalo, Ian Holm, and Patton Oswalt, where Ian Holm won the award. It won the Best Animated Feature Award from multiple associations including the Chicago Film Critics, the National Board of Review, the Annie Awards, the Broadcast Film Critics, the British Academy of Film and Television (BAFTA), and the Golden Globes.

Legacy

Video game

A primary video game adaptation of the film, titled Ratatouille, was released for all major consoles and handhelds in 2007. A Nintendo DS exclusive game, titled Ratatouille: Food Frenzy, was released in October 2007. Ratatouille is also among the films represented in Kinect Rush: A Disney-Pixar Adventure, released in March 2012 for Xbox 360. The video game based on the movie was released in 2007 for Xbox 360, Wii, PlayStation 2, GameCube, Xbox, Game Boy Advance, Nintendo DS, PlayStation Portable, Microsoft Windows, Mac OS X, Java ME, and mobile phones. A PlayStation 3 version was released on October 23, 2007. The other versions, however were all released on June 26, 2007.

Remy is featured in the video game Kingdom Hearts III. He appears as the head chef for Scrooge McDuck's bistro and participates with Sora in cooking minigames. He is addressed only as "Little Chef" in the game, as he does not speak and cannot reveal his name to the characters.

Remy, Linguini and Colette appear as playable characters in the world builder game Disney Magic Kingdoms, in addition to attractions based on Gusteau's Kitchen and Remy's Ratatouille Adventure. In the game, the characters are involved in new storylines that serve as a continuation of the events of the film.

In the video game Disney Dreamlight Valley, Remy appears as one of the characters that the player meets during the progress of the story, being the owner of the valley's restaurant, Chez Remy.

Theme park attraction

A Disney theme park attraction based on the film has been constructed in Walt Disney Studios Park, Disneyland Paris. Ratatouille: L'Aventure Totalement Toquée de Rémy is based upon scenes from the film and uses trackless ride technology. In the attraction, riders "shrink down to the size of a rat".
At the 2017 D23 Expo, Disney announced the attraction would be built at the France Pavilion in Epcot's World Showcase which opened on October 1, 2021, during the 50th anniversary of Walt Disney World and the 39th anniversary of Epcot.

Unofficial musical

In late 2020, users of the social media app TikTok crowdsourced the creation of a musical based on the film. A virtual concert presentation of it, produced by Seaview Productions, streamed for 72 hours on TodayTix beginning January 1, 2021 to benefit The Actors Fund in response to the COVID-19 pandemic. It is directed by Six co-creator and co-director Lucy Moss from a script adaptation by Michael Breslin and Patrick Foley, both of whom co-executive produced the concert with Jeremy O. Harris. The cast included Kevin Chamberlin as Gusteau, Andrew Barth Feldman as Linguini, Titus Burgess as Remy, Adam Lambert as Emile, Wayne Brady as Django, Priscilla Lopez as Mabel, Ashley Park as Colette, André De Shields as Anton Ego, Owen Tabaka as Young Anton Ego and Mary Testa as Skinner. The concert raised over $1.9 million for The Actors Fund.

References in popular culture 
The film has often been referenced in popular culture since its release, being mentioned or parodied on shows such as Saturday Night Live, My Name Is Earl, The Simpsons, Breaking Bad, Key & Peele, Orange Is the New Black, Teen Titans Go!, Difficult People, The Good Place, Once Upon a Time, and Brooklyn Nine-Nine, as well as in the films The Five-Year Engagement (2012) and The Suicide Squad (2021) and in comedian John Mulaney's comedy special New in Town.

A parody of Ratatouille is a significant plot thread in the 2022 film Everything Everywhere All at Once. Early in the film, the main character Evelyn Wang (Michelle Yeoh) attempts to explain the multiversal concept of "verse-jumping" to her family using the Pixar film as an analogy, only to misremember it as being about a raccoon and being titled Raccacoonie. Later, in one of several parallel universes, Evelyn is a teppanyaki chef who works with another teppanyaki chef named Chad (Harry Shum Jr.) who is indeed being puppeteered by the anthropomorphic Raccacoonie (voiced by Randy Newman) much like Remy and Linguini; during the film's climactic montage, Evelyn exposes Raccacoonie and he is taken away by Animal Control, before Evelyn has a change of heart and helps Chad rescue Raccacoonie from Animal Control. Reportedly inspired by producer Jonathan Wang's father's habit of misremembering the names of popular films, the running joke was described by IGN as "one of the film's highlights", while Alison Herman of The Ringer noted a thematic resonance as both films were about "the virtues of creativity within material constraints".

References

Works cited

External links

 
 
 
 

 
2000s American animated films
2000s fantasy comedy films
2007 computer-animated films
2007 films
American animated fantasy films
American coming-of-age films
American computer-animated films
American fantasy comedy films
American animated feature films
Animated coming-of-age films
Animated films about friendship
Animated films about rats
Best Animated Feature Academy Award winners
Best Animated Feature Annie Award winners
Best Animated Feature BAFTA winners
Best Animated Feature Broadcast Film Critics Association Award winners
Best Animated Feature Film Golden Globe winners
Cooking films
2000s English-language films
Films about chefs
Films about father–son relationships
Films about food and drink
Films directed by Brad Bird
Films produced by Brad Lewis
Films scored by Michael Giacchino
Animated films set in Paris
Films set in restaurants
Pixar animated films
Walt Disney Pictures animated films
2007 comedy films